Dagmar Schäfer is a German sinologist and historian of science. She is director of Department III, Artifacts, Action, Knowledge at the Max Planck Institute for the History of Science, Berlin. She is honorary professor for the history of technology, Technical University, Berlin; adjunct professor, Institute of Sinology, Freie Universität, Berlin, and Tianjin University (2018–2021). She was previously a Guest Professor at the School of History and Culture of Science, Shanghai Jiao Tong University. She was also the director of the Centre for Chinese Studies and held the professorial chair of Chinese Studies, both at the University of Manchester. 

Schäfer received her doctorate from the University of Würzburg, and her habilitation in the history of science in China. She has worked and studied at Zhejiang University, Peking University, National Tsing Hua University, the University of Pennsylvania, and the University of Manchester. 

She won the History of Science Society: Pfizer Award in 2012, and the Association for Asian Studies' Joseph Levenson Book Prize in 2013, for her 2011 book The Crafting of the 10,000 Things (University of Chicago Press). In 2014 he became a member of the German Academy of Sciences Leopoldina. She was awarded the Gottfried Wilhelm Leibniz Prize in 2020.

Selected publications

References

External links
 

Living people
Academics of the University of Manchester
German sinologists
Historians of China
Historians of science
Year of birth missing (living people)
Members of the German Academy of Sciences Leopoldina
Gottfried Wilhelm Leibniz Prize winners
Max Planck Institute directors
University of Würzburg alumni